CIKT-FM is a Canadian radio station that broadcasts an adult hits format at 98.9 FM in Grande Prairie, Alberta. The station is branded as 98.9 Rewind Radio and is owned by Pattison Media.

History
The station was originally granted a CRTC license on November 15, 2006, authorizing it to broadcast on 103.3 FM. After early testing determined that its planned transmitter site was not suitable, the station applied for a license amendment to move its transmitter and to change its frequency to 98.9.

The station began broadcasting on April 9, 2007 at 12:00PM as Q99, airing a hot adult contemporary format.

The station was purchased by Pattison Media in October 2015.

In 2019, the station moved towards an adult hits format, focusing on music from the 70’s to the 2000’s.

In September 2021, the station rebranded to 98.9 Rewind Radio.

Former logo

References

External links
98.9 Rewind Radio

IKT
IKT
Radio stations established in 2007
2007 establishments in Alberta
IKT